Reino Drockila (1870 - 26 October 1928) was a prominent Finnish Socialist and journalist. He was the chief editor of the newspaper Arbetaren (English: Worker). In 1899, he helped found the Finnish Labour Party. During the Finnish Civil War, he fled to the Russian SFSR. He lived in Moscow, where he was accused of espionage, sentenced to death and executed on 26 October 1928.

References

1870 births
1928 deaths
People from Pyhtää
People from Viipuri Province (Grand Duchy of Finland)
Social Democratic Party of Finland politicians
People of the Finnish Civil War (Red side)
Finnish people executed by the Soviet Union